Newcourt is a suburb of Exeter and Topsham in Devon, England, located between Digby and Topsham. It has a railway station and forms part of the electoral ward of Topsham.

History
During World War II, much of the land at Newcourt was used as a US Navy Supply Depot due to the strong transport links of Exeter. This facility was instrumental in the Normandy landings. In 2010, Exeter City Council produced a masterplan for Newcourt to include provisions for 3,500 homes to be built by 2026.

References

Areas of Exeter